Stephen A. Zarlenga (1941 – 25 April 2017) was a researcher and author in the field of monetary theory, trader in stock and financial markets, and advocate of monetary reform.

Biography
Zarlenga's parents Dino and Lisa emigrated from Italy during the Great Depression. He received a BA in psychology at the University of Chicago in 1963.

He worked in the fields of mutual fund investing, commodity trading, real estate, and insurance. In 1996, he founded  the American Monetary Institute, established as a 4947(a)(1) trust, dedicated to the "independent study of monetary history, theory and reform." He authored numerous articles and books, and gave lectures, participated in conferences and gave testimony to government committees, on "monetary reform."

He served as director of the American Monetary Institute (AMI) until his death.

Theories on money and banking
Zarlenga argued that, in a world where "the nature of money is a fiat of the law, an invention or creation of mankind," even in times of the gold standard,  the authority to "create money" should be the sole prerogative of a sovereign government. He supported the distinctions made by 19th century author Henry George between wealth and money, between money and credit, and between what George had called "privately-created credit, used in place of money and for private profit" and "government- or publicly- created money for the common good."

Hence, Zarlenga's support for the incorporation of  the Federal Reserve System, which he considered to be a "private institution," into the U.S. Treasury, "where all new money would be created by government as money, not interest-bearing debt", and "the nationalization of the monetary system," thus ending fractional banking. In an article published in the Barnes Review, to which he also reviewed publications, he blamed the hyperinflation in Weimar Germany on "the privately controlled Reichsbank that created "far too many German marks."

He wrote numerous articles on the subject of monetary reform along these lines, and, in 2002, authored the book The Lost Science of Money, first published in German in 1999, as Der Mythos Vom Geld – Die Geschichte Der Macht (The Mythology Of Money – The Story Of Power), where he also criticized the European common-currency regime.

Activism
Zarlenga actively supported monetary-reform legislation in the United States, appearing and giving testimony in government agencies, and in the House of Lords, UK. Democratic congressman Dennis Kucinich from Ohio introduced in 2010 a bill for the National Employment Emergency Defense Act, the text of which was based on a text earlier developed by Zarlenga, the so-called "American Monetary Act." The bill was eventually not introduced to the floor, since there were no other co-sponsors and no companion legislation in the Senate.

In 2004, Zarlenga organized AMI's first Monetary Reform Conference, which became an annual event.

Support
Zarlenga's views are supported by numerous people, including Post-Keynesians such as Australian Steve Keen and American Michael Hudson, and mainstream economists such as German former banker Michael Kumhof who found The Lost Science to be "a masterful work." The London-based organization Positive Money is promoting the views held by Zarlenga, while in June 2018, a referendum was held in Switzerland on a proposal to "eliminate bank-created money." The proposal was  defeated "in a landslide" with approximately 76% of voters against it.

In 2010, and again in 2016, the Green Party, US adopted in its platform on the economy proposals in line with Zarlenga's ideas on the nationalization of the Fed, the elimination of fractional banking, the creation by the state of so-called "debt-free money" only, etc.

Criticism
Austrian economists fundamentally disagree with nationalizations of any sectors of the economy and, thus, oppose Zarlenga's proposals to "nationalize central banks," such as the Fed in the U.S., which is presumed to be a private enterprise.

Although Zarlenga's history of fiat money was in line with heterodox analysis and especially Post-Keynesian, his notions of "sovereign money" aka "debt-free money," and the opposition to fractional banking have been criticized severely, especially the "refusal" to acknowledge that "all money is a liability of the issuing state."

Critics state that "debt-free money" advocates are "confused on the accounting, vague on the terminology, and rarely provide details on their proposal" and point out that the suggestion to have, for example in the United States, the central bank, instead of providing the government with a "loan", simply "transfer[ing]" money to the government's account with the Fed, would not make money “debt-free” because the Fed's liabilities grow: first, in the form of Treasury deposits, and, then, as the Treasury draws down those deposits, in the form of bank reserves. And they note that the Fed would continue to pay interest on reserves in order to control the interest rate. In the crritics' words, "debt-free money" can never be either debt-free or interest-free and the positions advocated by Zarlenga and supporters of "sovereign money" would only be "logically consistent" with zero interest-rates in the economy "forever."

Selected works

(with Poteat, Robert)

See also
NEED Act
American Monetary Institute
Money creation
Credit theory of money 
The Chicago Plan Revisited
Full-reserve banking
Modern Monetary Theory
Monetarism
Commodity money
Michael Rowbotham

Notes

References

Sources

Institutional

External links

American economists
1941 births
2017 deaths